The Susquehanna Art Museum is a non-profit art museum in the United States, located in Midtown Harrisburg, Pennsylvania, the state's capital.

History
In 1989, the Susquehanna Art Museum (SAM) began as an idea by a group of central Pennsylvanian art educators who felt the capital city needed an art museum. Guided by a desire to provide a forum that would be innovative, relevant, and engaging, they worked alongside community and business leaders with volunteers to create the museum.

Today, SAM is Central Pennsylvania's only dedicated art museum, mounting exhibitions that reflect the diverse cultural heritage of the community as well as a wide range of aesthetic interests. The galleries feature the work of local, regional, national, and international artists. It is a part of the North American Reciprocal Museum Association.

In addition, SAM's innovative outreach program, the VanGo! Museum on Wheels, reaches thousands of students each year and brings original works of art to students who otherwise lack such opportunities. VanGo! teaches all children that creativity lies within each of us, providing a forum for further development of important problem-solving and critical-thinking skills.

SAM is dedicated to encouraging and inspiring visitors of all ages to become more familiar with; knowledgeable of and appreciative of the art and culture that surrounds them. Educational programming is developed to enhance and enrich the visitor experience, providing a wide variety of classes, lectures, workshops, discussions, critiques, and more for adult learners. SAM's youth art programs explore drawing, painting, sculpture, art history, and art appreciation—a unique experience for students to learn from original works of art in a museum setting.

Structure and contents
On January 16, 2015, the Susquehanna Art Museum relocated to the transformed former Keystone Trust Building, located at 1401 North Third Street, Harrisburg, PA 17102.
 
The museum was once located in the heart of Harrisburg's central business district, where it occupied several floors of the Kunkel Building, also known as the Feller Building, at 301 Market Street. The structure was originally constructed as a bank in 1913, later converted to a department store, and now serves as a dormitory building for Harrisburg University students, with a Subway restaurant on the first floor.  The building's accents include a white-glazed terracotta exterior which creates architectural diversity. In 1925 the building was expanded to the rear in the same style as the original 1913 front portion. The Kunkel Building is listed on the National Register of Historic Places.

References

Commercial buildings completed in 1937
1989 establishments in Pennsylvania
Museums established in 1989
Art museums and galleries in Pennsylvania
Modern art museums in the United States
Art in Harrisburg, Pennsylvania
Museums in Harrisburg, Pennsylvania
Commercial buildings on the National Register of Historic Places in Pennsylvania
National Register of Historic Places in Harrisburg, Pennsylvania